Alexander Neil Somerville (1813–1889) was a Scottish minister and evangelist, who served as Moderator of the General Assembly for the Free Church of Scotland at Inverness in 1886/87. Glasgow University called him "Missionary to the World".

Life

He was born in Edinburgh on 29 January 1813, the eldest of eight children of Alexander Somerville, a wine-merchant living at 65 York Place, and his wife, Elizabeth Munro. He was educated at the High School on Calton Hill, his friends including Robert McCheyne and Horatius Bonar. He then studied Divinity at Edinburgh University.

He was ordained by the Church of Scotland at Anderston in Glasgow in 1837, replacing Rev Charles John Brown.

In the Disruption of 1843 he left the established Church of Scotland to join the  Free Church of Scotland, a new church being built for him in Cadogan Street. Following this he became an evangelist for the Free Church in Canada, Spain and especially in India. In Spain he organised a confession of faith for Spanish Protestants.

In 1873 he had a legitimate claim to the title of Baron Somerville but did not press his claim.

In 1874 he was invited to India By Rev John Fordyce of the Anglo-Indian Union. He visited over 20 cities in six months including Calcutta, Agra, Allahabad, Madras, Delhi and Bombay. An avid traveller his later trips included Australia and New Zealand in 1877/78. The visit to Dunedin and Otago in New Zealand in May 1878 proved particularly influential in promoting the Free Presbyterian movement in that country. This was partially at the invitation of a family friend, Captain William Cargill.

Later trips included Italy in 1880, Germany and Russia in 1881, South Africa 1882/3, Greece and Turkey 1885/6. In the summer of 1886 he was elected Moderator of the General Assembly the highest position in his church. He was succeeded by Rev Robert Rainy in 1887. Following his year in office he returned to evangelism, this time concentrating on Jewish areas in Hungary and southern Russia.

He died at home, 11 South Park Terrace in Glasgow on 18 September 1889. He is buried in the Western Necropolis, Glasgow.

Publications
A Course of Lectures on the Jews (1839)
Sacred Triads, Doctrinal and Practical (1859)
A Day in Laodicea (1861)
The Churches in Asia (1885)
Evangelism of the World (1886)
Precious Seeds Sown in Many Lands (1890-posthumously) [with  Memoir  by  his  son,  William  Francis Somerville

Family

He  married 10   June    1841,   Isabella    Mirrlees    (died 3 July 1900),  daughter of  James  Ewing of  Halifax,  Nova Scotia,  and  had  issue —
Alexander,  B.Sc,  merchant,  Calcutta,  afterwards of  Glasgow,  born  25 March 1842, died  5  June  1907 (married twice, latterly to Euphemia (born Gibb) politician and social worker )
James  Ewing,  M.A., B.D.,    minister    of    Free   Church,   Langholm, Broughty-Ferry, and U.F. Church, Mentone, editor of the    Continental    Presbyterian. born  1843
Marianne,  born  8 July 1845 (married 14 November 1865, George Halley Knight, of Dollar, Clackmannanshire. minister of  Free  Church,  Bearsden), died  12  May  1902
Eliza,  born  14 July 1848     (married     Jonathan     Kerr,     lieut.-col. Bengal Staff   Corps)
William    Francis, M.A.,  B.Sc,  M.B.,  CM.,  M.D.,  physician  in Glasgow,  lieut.-col.  commanding  2/1  Lowland Field  Ambulance,  R.A.M.C.  (T.),  born 14  June  1858.

References
Citations

Sources

See also

1813 births
1889 deaths
Clergy from Edinburgh
Alumni of the University of Edinburgh
Scottish Presbyterian missionaries
Presbyterian missionaries in India
Presbyterian missionaries in Australia
Presbyterian missionaries in New Zealand
Presbyterian missionaries in Italy
Presbyterian missionaries in Germany
Presbyterian missionaries in Russia
Presbyterian missionaries in South Africa
Presbyterian missionaries in Greece
Presbyterian missionaries in Turkey
Presbyterian missionaries in Hungary
Presbyterian missionaries in the Ottoman Empire
19th-century Ministers of the Church of Scotland
19th-century Ministers of the Free Church of Scotland